Elements of Love: Ballads is a compilation album by American band Earth, Wind & Fire, issued in June 1996 on Columbia Records. The album got to No. 24 on the Billboard Top R&B/Hip-Hop Catalog Albums chart.

Critical reception
Allmusic called the album "a sparkling, 14-song compilation of ballads". J.D. Considine of The Baltimore Sun described the LP as "a collection emphasizing Earth, Wind & Fire's mellow side".

Track listing
"Open Our Eyes" (Lumkins) – 5:06
"Keep Your Head to the Sky" (White) – 5:10
"Devotion" (Bailey, White) – 4:50
"Love's Holiday" (Scarborough, White) – 4:23
"Ponta de Areia (Brazilian Rhyme) (Interlude)" – (Brant, Nascimento) 	  0:53
"Be Ever Wonderful" (Dunn, White) – 5:08
"All About Love (First Impressions)" (Dunn, White) – 5:31
"Can't Hide Love" (Scarborough) – 4:09
"I'll Write a Song for You" (Bailey, Beckmeier, McKay) – 5:24
"After the Love Has Gone" (Champlin, Foster, Graydon) – 4:26
"Imagination" (Bailey, Stepney, White) – 5:15
"Side by Side" (Vaughn, White) – 5:32
"Spirit" (Dunn, White) – 3:12
"Reasons" (live) (Bailey, Stepney, White) – 8:22

References

1996 compilation albums
Earth, Wind & Fire compilation albums
Albums produced by Maurice White
Albums produced by Joe Wissert
Albums produced by Charles Stepney
Columbia Records compilation albums